Cinematronics is the second album released by the Norwegian electronica project Ugress. It was released on Tuba Records/Port Azur in 2004.

Track listing
 "Il Pirata"
 "Manhattan Sapphire"
 "Makina Fifth"
 "Cowboy Desperado"
 "Nightingale"
 "Bad Dreams Come True"
 "Binary Code"
 "The Beauty Never Lasts"
 "Monochromatic World"
 "Shadows And Doubts"
 "Battle 22"
 "Rainy Transylvanian Day"

2004 albums
Ugress albums